Doug Hansen (born 3 October 1948) is a Canadian luger. He competed at the 1972 Winter Olympics and the 1976 Winter Olympics.

References

1948 births
Living people
Canadian male lugers
Olympic lugers of Canada
Lugers at the 1972 Winter Olympics
Lugers at the 1976 Winter Olympics
People from Woodstock, New Brunswick
Sportspeople from New Brunswick